Cindy Carolina Rondón Martínez (born 12 November 1988 in Santo Domingo) is a volleyball player from the Dominican Republic, who twice won the bronze medal with the Dominican women's national team at the NORCECA Championship.

Career

2005–2011
Playing as a middle-blocker, she was named "Best Blocker" at the 2005 NORCECA Championship. She was signed by the Italian club BigMat Kerakoll Chieri and transferred on loan to Megius Padova.

At the 2006 TV Azteca’s Women Stars Volleyball Cup, she won the "Best Spiker" award and the gold medal with her team. She won the "Best Blocker" of the 2007 season of the LVSF with Vaqueras de Bayamón and was also selected for the All-Star game. She played for Denso Airybees from 2007/2008 until 2008/2009, when she suffered an injury and had a vertebra replacement. Playing in Chiapas, Mexico with her National Senior Team she won the 2010 Final Four Cup gold medal.

2013–present
Rondón signed for the 2012/13 season with Peruvian club Deportivo Géminis to play the Liga Nacional Superior de Voleibol. She was signed as replacement player of fellow Dominican player Lisvel Elisa Eve after Eve suffered an exposed tibia and fibula fracture while playing a match for the Peruvian team.

Clubs
 Deportivo Nacional (2003)
 Bameso (2004)
 Modeca (2005)
 Megius Volley Padova (2005–2006)
 Vaqueras de Bayamón (2007)
 Denso Airybees (2007–2009)
 Distrito Nacional (2010)
 Mirador (2010–2012)
 Deportivo Géminis (2013)
 Deportivo Géminis (2014-2015)

Awards

Individuals
 2005 NORCECA Championship "Best Blocker"
 2006 TV Azteca’s Women Stars Volleyball Cup "Best Spiker"
 2007 Puero Rican League "Best Blocker"
 2007 Puero Rican League All-Star
 2007 Pan-American Games "Best Blocker"
 2008 Pan-American Cup "Best Blocker"
 2015 Liga Nacional Superior de Voleibol Femenino "Best Outside Hitter"
 2015 Liga Nacional Superior de Voleibol Femenino "Best Scorer"
 2015 Liga Nacional Superior de Voleibol Femenino "MVP"

References

External links
 FIVB biography
 Italian League profile
 Japan V-League profile

1988 births
Living people
Sportspeople from Santo Domingo
Dominican Republic women's volleyball players
Volleyball players at the 2012 Summer Olympics
Volleyball players at the 2007 Pan American Games
Olympic volleyball players of the Dominican Republic
Central American and Caribbean Games gold medalists for the Dominican Republic
Competitors at the 2006 Central American and Caribbean Games
Competitors at the 2010 Central American and Caribbean Games
Middle blockers
Opposite hitters
Expatriate volleyball players in Italy
Expatriate volleyball players in the United States
Expatriate volleyball players in Japan
Expatriate volleyball players in Peru
Dominican Republic expatriate sportspeople in Italy
Dominican Republic expatriate sportspeople in the United States
Dominican Republic expatriate sportspeople in Japan
Dominican Republic expatriates in Peru
Central American and Caribbean Games medalists in volleyball
Pan American Games competitors for the Dominican Republic